is a private university at Toyoake, Aichi, Japan. The predecessor of the school was founded in 1964, and it was chartered as a university in 1968.

Fujita Health University College is a junior college program.

Organization

Faculties

  School of Health Sciences 
 Faculty of Medical Technology
 Faculty of Nursing
 Faculty of Radiological Technology
 Faculty of Rehabilitation
 Faculty of Clinical Engineering
 Faculty of Medical Management and Information Science
  School of Medicine

Graduate school

 School of Medical Research
 School of Health Research

College

 Medical Technology Course
 Medical Information Systems Course
 Specialist Course (Clinical Technologist Course)

Academy of Nursing

 Nursing Course (3-year full-time course)

Library

 Fujita Health Sciences Library

Affiliated Institutions

 Institute for Comprehensive Medical Science
 Fujita Memorial Nanakuri Institute
 Education and Research Center for Animal Models of Human Diseases

Hospitals

 Fujita Health University Hospital
 Fujita Health University Emergency Lifesaving Center
 Fujita Health University Banbuntane Houtokukai Hospital
 Fujita Health University Nanakuri Sanatorium

International Collaboration
 Faculty of Medicine, Khon Kaen University
 Chulalongkorn University
 Universita degli Studi di Milano-Bicocca
 Gachon University
 National Taiwan University
 University of Zambia
 Suzhou Health College
 Capital Medical University
 United Arab Emirates University 
 Seoul National University College of Medicine
 University of Medicine 1, Yangon 
 Hanoi Medical University
 Asean College
 Johns Hopkins University

References

External links
 Official website

Educational institutions established in 1964
Private universities and colleges in Japan
Medical schools in Japan
Fujita Health University
Japanese junior colleges
1964 establishments in Japan
Toyoake, Aichi